Oberea bivittata is a species of flat-faced longhorn beetle in the tribe Saperdini in the genus Oberea. It was described by Per Olof Christopher Aurivillius in 1911.

References

B
Beetles described in 1911